Anjiang railway station is a railway station on the Beijing-Shenyang high-speed railway located in Chengde County, Chengde, Hebei, China. It opened on 22 January 2021.

References

Railway stations in Hebei
Stations on the Beijing–Harbin High-Speed Railway
Railway stations in China opened in 2021